Susahab (also Romanized as Sūsahāb; as soosahab; also known as Susava) is a village in the Khalkhal county, Ardebil Province, Iran. 
It is believed that this name is due to so many springs which are exist there.
The most important of these springs are:
Turkan bulaqi, Soyuq bulaq, Dash bulaq, Qani bulaq and so on.

Population
At the 2011 census, its population was 552, in 166 families (including 275 men and 277 women).

Tourist attractions
Because of its original nature Susahab is one of the tourist destinations.
People who are interested in climbing will love the Agh Dagh mountain.  
Agh Dagh is khalkhal's highest mountain. Its peak is 3321 meters.

More information
To find more information, we invite you to see:
http://susahab.blogfa.com/

Picture Gallery

References 

Tageo

External links 

.

Towns and villages in Khalkhal County